"So Soon in the Morning" is a traditional religious song performed in 1959 by Joan Baez and Bill Wood on Baez's first album, Folksingers 'Round Harvard Square. The duo sung it in a fast gospel tempo. The lyrics contain lines from a 19th-century hymn, "I heard the voice of Jesus say", written in 1846 by Horatius Bonar:I heard the voice of Jesus say, “Come unto Me and rest;Lay down, thou weary one, lay down Thy head upon My breast.” as well as a stanza from "Father, I stretch my hands to thee", a hymn by Charles Wesley:Father, I stretch my hands to thee, no other help I know;If thou withdraw thyself from me, ah! whither shall I go?altering the words toO Lord, I stretch my hand to thee, no other help I know;If thou withdraw thy hand from me, wherever shall I go?

External links
So Soon in the Morning at YouTube

Joan Baez songs
Gospel songs